The Federal Agency for Ethnic Affairs (FADN) is a Russian federal agency tasked with nationality and ethnic policy. It was formed through presidential ukase on March 31, 2015 and is an independent agency that functions as part of the government of Russia.

References

External links 
 Official website 

2015 establishments in Russia
Government agencies established in 2015
Government agencies of Russia